Jaina can refer to:

 Jain/Jaina, a follower of Jainism, an ancient classical religion of India
 List of Jains, a list of various notable Jains
 Federation of Jain Associations in North America (JAINA)
 Jaina Island, an archaeological site of the Maya civilization, in the present-day Mexican state of Campeche
 Jaina Solo, a fictional Star Wars Expanded Universe character
 Jaina Proudmoore, a fictional character in the Warcraft franchise and Heroes of the Storm
Jaina (grape), a Spanish wine grape

See also

 
 
 Jain (disambiguation)
 Jayna (name)